Gareth James Ward is an Australian politician who served as the New South Wales Minister for Families, Communities and Disability Services in the second Berejiklian ministry from 2019 to 2021. Ward is a member of the New South Wales Legislative Assembly and has represented the seat of Kiama since 2011. He is currently suspended from Parliament.

Ward has also previously served as the Parliamentary Secretary for Education, in addition to his role as the Parliamentary Secretary for the Illawarra and South Coast from 2017 until 2019. Previously, Ward was a councillor on Shoalhaven City Council from 2004 until 2012.

Ward was born with albinism and is legally blind.

Early life 
Ward was born in the Illawarra region and completed his schooling at Bomaderry High School. He holds degrees in commerce and arts from the University of Wollongong and Bachelor of Laws from the University of New England, and a Master of Laws from the University of Sydney. He holds a Graduate Diploma in Legal Practice from the Australian National University, and is an Admitted Solicitor in the Supreme Court of NSW and the High Court of Australia. From 2001 to 2006, Ward served on the Council of the Wollongong Undergraduate Students' Association at the university. Ward was involved with the Australian Liberal Students Federation.

Political career
On 27 March 2004, Ward was elected to the Shoalhaven City Council as an independent councillor representing the northern parts of Shoalhaven. He was re-elected on 13 September 2008 and was appointed deputy mayor in the same month.

On 12 April 2010, Ward was preselected as the Liberal candidate for Kiama. It was reported that he gained preselection in a 20–12 vote against the previous candidate, Ann Sudmalis. At the 2011 state election, Ward was elected with a swing of 19.4 points and won the seat with 57.5 per cent of the vote on a two-party basis. Ward's main opponent was the incumbent sitting Labor member and former Minister, Matt Brown.

In April 2015, Ward was appointed as Parliamentary Secretary for the Illawarra and South Coast after Premier Mike Baird abolished the former position of Minister for the Illawarra. In March 2017, Ward was appointed  to serve as the Parliamentary Secretary for Education. Ward retained his existing responsibilities as the Parliamentary Secretary for the Illawarra and South Coast.

Following the 2019 state election Ward was appointed as the Minister for Families, Communities and Disability Services in the Second Berejiklian ministry.

He is currently awaiting trial on charges of sexual and indecent assault. In February 2023, he announced that he would be contesting his seat as an independent at the 2023 state election, "to stand up for the principles and values that are worth fighting for".

Controversies 
In September 2017, Ward claimed to have been the target of an attempted mugging in New York City while staying at the Intercontinental Hotel. Ward claimed to have booked a male masseur for a massage, which was reported as a "special massage" (in conflicting reports, it is claimed he "called a phone number provided by an acquaintance"  but others reported he ordered "the massage online from an outside service"  ). When two men turned up and announced that both of them were minors, Ward told them to leave. He then claimed the duo became aggressive and demanded US$1000 before they would leave. While luring the men down to the lobby under the guise of retrieving money from an ATM, Ward alerted hotel staff and the men fled. CCTV images were circulated but no arrests have been made.

In September 2018, Ward was described in Federal Parliament by his fellow Liberal colleague Ann Sudmalis as leading a campaign of "bullying, betrayal and backstabbing" against her while she was a representative. The allegations were expanded to include branch stacking of local Liberal branches, and installing people hostile to Sudmalis on her electoral committee. She described his determination as to "annihilate anyone who opposed him" with his motivation being "Gareth's narcissistic revenge". Sudmalis went on to accuse him of misogynistic behaviour and raised several examples of where he had actively opposed and campaigned against female Liberals on the South Coast.

Criminal charges
On 14 May 2021, Ward resigned from his portfolio and moved to the cross-bench after identifying himself as the state MP subject to an inquiry by the child abuse and sex crimes squad of the New South Wales Police Force. Ward has denied the allegations.

On 22 March 2022, Ward was charged with three counts of indecent assault, one count each of sexual intercourse without consent, and one count of common assault. He allegedly indecently assaulted a 17-year-old boy at Meroo Meadow in February 2013 and sexually abused a 27-year-old man in Sydney in September 2015. Ward was granted conditional bail to appear at Port Kembla Local Court on 18 May. The NSW Premier called for his resignation from Parliament and said that should Ward not resign, the Government would move a motion to remove him from Parliament. On 24 March 2022, he was suspended from parliament through a motion which passed unanimously in the Legislative Assembly.

On 19 August 2022, Ward was committed to stand trial for sexual and indecent assault. He was due to appear  before Downing Centre District Court on 14 September 2022.

References 

Living people
Liberal Party of Australia members of the Parliament of New South Wales
Members of the New South Wales Legislative Assembly
New South Wales local councillors
Blind politicians
University of Wollongong alumni
21st-century Australian politicians
Year of birth missing (living people)